Ole Olsen (5 May 1863 – 5 October 1943) was a Danish film producer and the 1906 founder of Nordisk Film.

Olsen was born in Starreklinte, Vallekilde Parish on the Odsherred peninsula of northwestern Zealand; he died in Hellerup, outside Copenhagen.

References

External links 
 

1863 births
1943 deaths
Danish film producers